Robert Hawker Dowling (1827 – 8 July 1886) was an Australian colonial artist.

Biography
Dowling was born in England the youngest son of Rev. Henry Dowling and his wife Elizabeth, née Darke. He was brought to Launceston, Tasmania with his parents in 1839 in the Janet. He received lessons from Thomas Bock and Frederick Strange, and in 1850 advertised as a portrait painter. In 1856 Dowling left for London partly with the help of friends in Launceston. He exhibited 16 pictures at the Royal Academy between 1859 and 1882 and others at the British Institute. Returning to Launceston he afterwards came to Melbourne and painted portraits of Sir Henry Loch, Dr James Moorhouse, Francis Ormond, and others. He went to London again in 1886 but died shortly after his arrival.

Dowling was a conscientious painter of figure subjects, often scriptural or eastern. He is represented in the Melbourne and Launceston galleries.

On 2 May 2007, one of Dowling's paintings – Masters George, William and Miss Harriet Ware with the Aborigine Jamie Ware – was bought for A$823,500 by the National Gallery of Victoria.

References

 Isabella J. Mead, 'Dowling, Robert Hawker (1827 - 1886)', Australian Dictionary of Biography, Volume 4, MUP, 1972, p. 98. Retrieved on 4 October 2008

Additional resources listed by the Australian Dictionary of Biography:
H. Button, Flotsam and Jetsam (Launceston, 1909); 'no 364. "Early Effort: Art in Australia"', Art-Journal (London), 1860, p 169; Art-Journal (London), 1860, pp 351, 379; Examiner (Launceston), 5, 19 Mar 1851, 25 Aug, 20, 23 Oct 1860, 19 Feb 1863, 16 Feb, 20 1864, 15, 17 July 1886; Atlas (London), 25 Aug 1860; Cornwall Chronicle (Launceston), 20 Oct 1860, 29 June 1877; Daily Telegraph (Launceston), 23 Feb, 26 Mar 1885, Tasmanian (Launceston), 24 Apr 1886

External links

Robert Dowling at ARTcyclopedia
Grandfather's visit 1865 - Ballarat Fine Art Gallery.

1827 births
1886 deaths
English emigrants to colonial Australia
Settlers of Tasmania
19th-century Australian painters
19th-century Australian male artists
Australian male painters